The Great Mosque of Samarra (or ) is a mosque from the 9th century CE located in Samarra, Iraq. The mosque was commissioned in 848 and completed in 851 by the Abbasid caliph Al-Mutawakkil who reigned (in Samarra) from 847 until 861. At the time of construction, it was the world's largest mosque. The mosque is located within the  Samarra Archaeological City UNESCO World Heritage Site, listed in 2007.

History
The reign of Al-Mutawakkil had a great effect on the appearance of the city, for he seemed to have been a lover of architecture, and the one responsible for building the great Mosque of Samarra. Al-Mutawakkil and his hired workers as well as other people from the area  constructed this mosque using baked brick octagon piers that included four marble columns in the corners. The marble columns were imported, which draws on the fact that Al-Mutawakkil hired artists and architects from all over the Abbasid empire to help him construct the Great Mosque. In a list of his building projects which appears in several different versions, the new Congregational Mosque and up to twenty palaces are mentioned, totalling between 258 and 294 million dirhams. The new Congregational Mosque, with its spiral minaret, built between 849 (235 AH) and 851 (235 AH), formed part of an extension of the city to the east, extending into the old hunting park.

The mind behind the mosque, Al-Mutawakkil, was assassinated in 861, and structures like this mosque were then difficult to credit to a subsequent caliph. There was unrest and a ten year period of trouble, including a civil war in 865–866. This Great Mosque was one of the last buildings with a known name attributed to it in this period.

The mosque itself was destroyed in 1278 C.E. (656 A.H.), after Hulagu Khan's invasion of Iraq. Only the outer wall and its minaret remain. However, the Iraqi State Organization of Antiquities have been working closely with historians and architects in a restoration process starting in 1956. They tasked people to restore various monuments in Samarra including the Great Mosque. There was extensive restoration done to both the courtyard of the mosque as well as the spiral minaret. Previously only 6 steps remained in the minaret and very few complete arches surrounding the courtyard.

Former mosque
The mosque had 17 aisles, and its walls were paneled with mosaics of dark blue glass. It was part of an extension of Samarra eastwards. The art and architecture of the mosque were influential; stucco carvings within the mosque in floral and geometric designs represent early Islamic decoration. The Mosque of Ibn Tulun in Cairo, Egypt, was based on the Samarra Mosque in many regards and similarly stands in a large open space.

At the time of construction, another major feature of Samarra was the inlets of the great Nahrawan canal. This provided flood plains for a rich agricultural centre. Small and medium sized game were also hunted in the area. This encompassed the main area of the city that held Islamic structures like the main palace and subsidiary palaces of the Waziri and the Umari as well as a large number of houses in a residential area. The Great Mosque was built right outside this main area and became a staple for the people of Samarra as well as visitors and foreigners. This project, along with others by Al-Mutawakkil, transformed the city of Samarra from a medium-sized centre into the enormous city seen today.

The Great Mosque of Samarra was largely destroyed following an invasion of Iraq in the 13th century, after which it fell into disuse. Already in a ruinous state the mosque sustained further damage in 2005 when the mostly intact minaret - one of the few parts to have survived - was partially destroyed as well. This fell due to a use of modern technology and a bombing that took place. This bombing raid took place by insurgents at Samarra. There are many stories to why this took place but the truth, for the most part, remains undiscovered. There have been renovations since this bombing as an attempt to return the mosque to its former glory.

Architecture

Layout
The mosque's main structure is encompassed by a baked brick wall on the outer edge including forty-four semi-circular towers supporting the structure. The outer wall includes twenty-eight windows. Twenty-four of them are facing the southeastern side, the qiblah. There is one window for each aisle, excluding the mihrab site. The building has a total of sixteen doors that provide access. The interior of the mosque presents a large courtyard surrounded by covered aisles on all sides. The prayer hall featured a large mihrab framed as an arch. There was a fountain in the center of the courtyard that was covered and decorated in marble tile and mosaics. This fountain was believed to be carved from one large stone (called a kasat al-fir'awn or, the Pharaoh's Cup) and carried to this area by elephants. It was constructed by caliph al-Wathiq. The traditional mosque courtyard was square, however, the Great Mosque of Samarra portrayed a rectangular courtyard surrounded by these two layers of walls. It is known by historians and architects for the walls of the mosque to be covered in glazed or glass panels. These would be in the traditional blues, whites, and golds used in many other mosques. Fragments of these panels have been found by archaeologists working on the mosques. The interior of the mosque has ceilings with a height of 11 meters with a total of 464 pillars supporting this baked brick ceiling. For the most part the interior is plain and the focus was a strong foundation set by a continuous brick slab holding together these pillars.

Minaret

Al-Minārat al-Malwiyyah ("The Twisted Minaret" or "The Snail Shell Minaret") was originally connected to the mosque by a bridge.

The height of the Malwiyyah made it practical to be used for the adhan (call to prayer). It is visible from a considerable distance in the area around Samarra and therefore may have been designed as a strong visual statement of the presence of Islam in the Tigris Valley.

The minaret's unique spiral design is said by some to be derived from the architecture of the Mesopotamian ziggurats. This design, completed under al-Mutawakkil, was unlike other minarets created in this time or anything else seen in the Islamic world because of its base's shape. The Mesopotamian Ziggurats had a square base while this minaret and others built like it in Iraq have a circular base with a twisted spiral leading up to the top. Some consider the influence of the Pillar of Gor, which was also square not circular, built in the Sasanian Empire, more prominent. This style of spiraling minaret was then repeated by the caliph Abu Dulaf for his mosque (also in Samarra). These minarets become a focal point of the skyline in any city and are a call to attention and prayer.

In 2005 the top of the Malwiyyah minaret was bombed. US forces in their invasion of the country used the minaret as a sniper tower before it was destroyed.

Structures
The minaret's spiral shape inspired Pritzker Architecture Prize winner Philip Johnson's design for the 1976 Chapel of Thanksgiving at Thanks-Giving Square in Dallas, Texas, in the United States. The minarets of a prominent Emirati mosque, that of Sheikh Khalifa in Al Ain, have been also been inspired by this minaret. The influence of the minaret and courtyard of the mosque is seen in these places, as well as in modern mosques.

Gallery

See also

 Firuzabad, Fars
 Chogha Zanbil
 The Wonderful Barn

References

External links

The Great Mosque, Samarra, Iraq

Photo of The Great Mosque
Photo and information
Photos, floor plans, and information
Ernst Herzfeld Papers, Series 7: Records of Samarra Expeditions, Great Mosque of al-Mutawakkil  Collections Search Center, S.I.R.I.S., Smithsonian Institution, Washington, D.C.
Ernst Herzfeld Papers, Series 7: Records of Samarra Expeditions, 1906-1945 Smithsonian Institution, Freer Gallery of Art and Arthur M. Sackler Gallery Archives, Washington, DC

9th-century mosques
Great Samarra
Abbasid architecture
Great Mosque
World Heritage Sites in Iraq
Islamic antiquities